Publique Sportive Mouara is an association football club from Central African Republic based in Bangui.

The team has won the Central African Republic League in 1981 and 1986.

Stadium
Currently the team plays at the 35,000 capacity Barthelemy Boganda Stadium.

Honours
Central African Republic League: 1981, 1986

References

External links
Publique Sportive Mouara - Wildstat
Publique Sportive Mouara - Foot-base

Football clubs in the Central African Republic
Bangui